The John Hustis House is located in Hustisford, Wisconsin.

History
John Hustis was the founder and namesake of Hustisford. He would reside in the house until his death in 1907. Since then, it has been acquired by the local historical society and turned into a museum. It was listed on the National Register of Historic Places in 1983 and on the State Register of Historic Places in 1989.

References

Houses on the National Register of Historic Places in Wisconsin
National Register of Historic Places in Dodge County, Wisconsin
Houses in Dodge County, Wisconsin
Greek Revival architecture in Wisconsin
Houses completed in 1857